Penn's Park General Store Complex, also known as the Gaines Property, is a historic commercial complex located at Penn's Park, Wrightstown Township, Bucks County, Pennsylvania. It is south of the Penns Park Historic District.  The complex consists of three primary buildings: a farmhouse, store building, and frame bank barn, along with six outbuildings.  The farmhouse was built in 1810, and is a 2 1/2-story, six bay, fieldstone rectangular building in the Georgian style.  The store building was built in 1836, and is a three-story, three bay by three bay, fieldstone building.  The outbuildings consist of a storage shed, wagon building, chicken house, livestock barn, wood shed, and outhouse.  The store housed a post office until 1971.

It was added to the National Register of Historic Places in 1985.

Gallery

References

Commercial buildings on the National Register of Historic Places in Pennsylvania
Georgian architecture in Pennsylvania
Houses completed in 1810
Buildings and structures in Bucks County, Pennsylvania
National Register of Historic Places in Bucks County, Pennsylvania